"Behind These Hazel Eyes" is a song by American singer Kelly Clarkson for her second studio album, Breakaway (2004). It was written by Clarkson with the song's producers Max Martin and Dr. Luke. The song was released on April 12, 2005, as the second single from the album. Clarkson considered "Behind These Hazel Eyes" as one of her favorite songs and she once intended to name Breakaway after the song. "Behind These Hazel Eyes" is an uptempo song that incorporates crunchy guitars which are pulsated with driving beats and anthemic choruses; it narrates Clarkson's broken relationship with her ex-boyfriend.

"Behind These Hazel Eyes" peaked at number six on the Billboard Hot 100 and stayed inside the top 10 in the chart for 15 weeks, a record for the longest time spent in the top 10 for a song that did not hit top five, until it was beaten by Rihanna's "Needed Me" in 2016. It also became Clarkson's first song to top the Adult Pop Songs chart. It was certified platinum from Recording Industry Association of America (RIAA) for selling over one million digital downloads. Elsewhere, the song charted in the top 10 in Australia, Austria, Ireland, Netherlands, New Zealand and the United Kingdom.

The song's accompanying music video was directed by Joseph Kahn and produced by Danyi Deats-Barrett. The concept of the video was conceived by Clarkson and depicts her as a bride who experiences some dream-like hints that her fiancé is having an affair with a brunette ceremony attendee. The music video premiered online at MTV and it also received heavy rotation on Total Request Live. The song was performed live by Clarkson at numerous venues, including the Breakaway World Tour (2005) and the All I Ever Wanted Tour (2009).

Background and writing
In 2004, Clarkson flew to Sweden to collaborate with Max Martin and Lukasz "Dr. Luke" Gottwald for her album, Breakaway. Clarkson and Martin were interested in turning in a more rock direction, as opposed to the "slick pop" with which they were identified. The songs "Since U Been Gone" as well as "Behind These Hazel Eyes" were the products of their collaboration. According to Dr. Luke, "Behind These Hazel Eyes" was sent to Clarkson without any lyrics as part of an olive branch to the singer. He explained,
We had just done with "Since U Been Gone," which everyone was happy with. We sent a rough version of "Behind These Hazel Eyes," without any lyrics, to Kelly and Clive Davis. It was in part an olive branch to Kelly, because there was miscommunication on "Since U Been Gone," where Kelly had written some lyrics and Max and I didn't know about it and we had finished the song. So we wanted to write "Behind" with her from the beginning, but we were in different places. She had just won "American Idol" and was on tour, so she'd e-mail me lyrics, and I'd e-mail her my thoughts.
In an interview with Entertainment Weekly, Clarkson explains that "Behind These Hazel Eyes" is "about the dipstick who completely screwed up and now is unhappy and you're happy." She also considered the song as one of her favorites that she once intended to name Breakaway after the song. Critics speculated that the song reflects Clarkson's break-up with David Hodges, an ex-member of Evanescence. According to MTV, the song was originally written prior to the break-up. Nonetheless, Clarkson decided to tweak the song lyrics after breaking up with Hodges to express her emotional pain. Clarkson also said that the song almost did not make it into the album. She explained, "It had different lyrics in the beginning [...] I ended up calling Luke [Lukasz Gottwald], the writer, and we did a totally different song to it. It's now my favorite song on the record. Crappy relationships [make for] a good song."

Composition

"Behind These Hazel Eyes" is a power ballad that was written by Clarkson, Max Martin, and Dr. Luke and produced by the latter two. According to the sheet music published at Musicnotes.com by Alfred Publishing, it is set in common time and has a moderate tempo of 90 beats per minute. It is composed in the key of F sharp minor with Clarkson's vocal range spanning over two octaves from F#3 to F#5. The bridge was the only part of the song that was written by Dr. Luke and Martin together with Clarkson face to face. The song begins with Clarkson wailing "oh oh oh" over a restless percussion. In the first verse, the music becomes quiet to focus on Clarkson's vocal as she wails "Seems like just yesterday/You were a part of me/I used to stand so tall/I used to be so strong/Your arms around me tight/Everything it felt so right/Unbreakable like nothing could go wrong." During the chorus, the sound of electronic guitar is dominant as she vocalizes "Here I am/Once again/I’m torn into pieces/Can’t deny it/Can’t pretend/Just thought you were the one/Broken up deep inside/But you won’t get to see the tears I cry/Behind these hazel eyes." Gil Kaufman of MTV noticed that the song "soared on crunchy guitars, driving beats and anthemic, agitated choruses."

Lyrically, the song narrates the story of a failed relationship which initially started off well. Clarkson regrets having allowed herself to be vulnerable to her ex-boyfriend and she is determined that despite the pain that she feels, he will not get the satisfaction of seeing her cry. Michael Paoletta of Billboard praised Clarkson's vocal, writing "Clarkson simply delivers a loose, tour-de-force vocal that simmers alongside a steroid-charged musical backdrop that is fun, fast and furious." Scott Juba of The Trade praised the production of the song, writing "The song’s strong hook pulls listeners in and involves them in the lyrics without ever becoming gimmicky or manipulative." He also complimented Clarkson's vocal which "oscillates between pain and defiance with near pinpoint accuracy."

Reception and accolades

Elizabeth Scott of Sky Living wrote, "while Clarkson is doing well musically, her love life still hasn't picked up and she is heartbroken once again. I'm sure the thought of another top ten hit might cheer her up!" Scott Juba of The Trades considered "Behind These Hazel Eyes" as the highlight of the album, writing "Now that [Clarkson is] a few years older than she was when she recorded her first album, she brings more authenticity to relationship songs." Evan Sawdey of PopMatters compared "Don't Let Me Stop You" (2009) with "Behind These Hazel Eyes" saying that the former "may sound like another rewrite of an older Clarkson hit (in this case, "Behind These Hazel Eyes"), but the observational lyrics about a questionable relationship are what ultimately makes the whole thing click." Charles Merwin of Stylus Magazine felt that the song should sell records more because "the entire musical backing drops out to let Clarkson’s voice through to live or die on its own." Pam Avoledo of Blogcritics believed that "Behind These Hazel Eyes" was superior to the writing of "Since U Been Gone", commenting that "It's punchier, well-written and gives Clarkson a chance to show off her vocal skills without the trendy haughtiness." Joe Cross of Cox Communications thought that "Behind These Hazel Eyes" was a decent follow-up to "Since U Been Gone", saying "It's no "Since U Been Gone" which is just a pop-rock juggernaut, but as follow-ups go, it's not too shabby. Clarkson's down-home everything (well, mostly her looks) sells these little heartbreak haikus exceptionally well." He also listed "Behind These Hazel Eyes" as one of the 40 songs that defined the summer of 2005. The same sentiment was echoed by Robert Copsey of Digital Spy who considered the song as Clarkson's second best single after "Since U Been Gone", writing "It proved a slow burner at the time of release, but this track's greatness continues to be realised over time."

"Behind These Hazel Eyes" was listed at number five on Billboard magazine's list of Songs of the Summer of 2005. In 2015, the same publication ranked the song at number four on its list of Top 100 'American Idol' Hits of All Time. It also appeared at number three on the list of Kelly Clarkson's Top 15 Biggest Billboard Hot 100 Hits. Chris Kal of WKNS ranked "Behind These Hazel Eyes" at number four in his list of "Top 10 Summer Songs From 2005". Sam Lamsky of PopCrush described the song as "a surefire fan favorite" and ranked it at number nine in his list of "Top 10 Kelly Clarkson songs". Bill Lamb of About.com put the song at number 62 on his list of "Top 100 Pop Songs of 2005". The song was nominated in the category for Song of the Year: Mainstream Hit Radio in the 2005 Radio Music Awards. At the 24th ASCAP Pop Music Awards, the song was honored with the Most Performed Songs award. In January 2010, "Behind These Hazel Eyes" was the fifth most played song of the last decade by American Idol performers. According to Nielsen Broadcast Data Systems, the song has been played 513,149 times through the week ending March 24, 2010.

Chart performance
"Behind These Hazel Eyes" debuted at number eighty-seven on the Billboard Hot 100 on the week ending, April 23, 2005. The song stayed inside the top ten in Billboard Hot 100 for fifteen weeks before peaking at number six on the week ending June 11, 2005. It consequently held the record as the song with the most weeks in the chart's top ten without hitting the top five, before being surpassed by Rihanna's "Needed Me" which spent sixteen weeks in the top ten but only peaked at number seven, eleven years later in 2016.

On the week ending May 28, 2005, "Behind These Hazel Eyes" jumped from number seven to number three on the Billboard Pop 100 Airplay chart. With "Since U Been Gone" holding steady at number two, the ascent made Clarkson the first artist with two songs in the top three of the chart. The song also appeared on the US Pop Songs at number thirty on the week ending April 30, 2005, and peaked at number two on the week ending July 9, 2005. It spent seven consecutive weeks at number two and was held off the top spot by Mariah Carey's "We Belong Together". It became the sixteenth ranked single of the 2000s decade on the Pop Songs chart compiled by Billboard. On the Billboards Radio Songs, the song peaked at number four on August 6, 2005. On the week ending August 27, 2005, the song topped the Adult Top 40 and stayed in the position for five consecutive weeks. On January 31, 2008, "Behind These Hazel Eyes" was certified platinum by the Recording Industry Association of America (RIAA). The song has sold 1,644,000 digital copies in the United States as of September 2017.

Internationally, "Behind These Hazel Eyes" was a commercial success. In Australia, the song debuted and peaked at number six on the week ending July 3, 2005. In New Zealand, the song entered New Zealand Singles Chart and peaked at number seven on the week ending July 4, 2005, as the highest debut of the week. In the United Kingdom, the song also debuted and peaked at number nine on the week ending October 1, 2005. In Ireland, the song debuted at number nine on the week ending September 22, 2005, and peaked at number four on the week ending November 3, 2005.

Music video

Background and release
The music video was directed by Joseph Kahn and was produced by Danyi Deats-Barrett. It was shot for two days in April 2005 in Toronto at a Church and a sound stage while Clarkson was on tour. According to Kahn, Clarkson was sick during the production and could not speak. During Clarkson's wardrobe fitting, they communicated together using notes written by her. Though she is seen speaking and is interviewed in the behind the scenes footage. Access Hollywood reported that a single sprinkler was used to produce rain in the music video. The concept of the music video was conceived by Clarkson. She explained, "The whole thing is a metaphor about a broken fairy tale [...] You think everything is going well, and then reality kicks your butt. It's kind of a sad video, but it's going to be my best one. It's real, and that's why people like me." Clarkson also added that after the production of the music video was completed, she had bruises and a green-and-yellow splotch on her left biceps. The music video premiered online on May 9, 2005, on MTV. On May 16, 2005, it premiered on Total Request Live where it debuted at number five on the chart the following day.

Synopsis
The music video begins with Clarkson standing in a room wearing a white wedding dress. Holding a bouquet of red roses, she is surrounded by her bridesmaids as they prepare for her wedding. She sits down on a sofa and sees a wedding photo of her fiancé with another woman as a storm grows outside. The bridesmaids are unable to close the windows so they run out of the room leaving Clarkson alone, who is seen dropping the bouquet of rose as well as the wedding photo from her hands onto the floor. The next scene shows Clarkson walking down the aisle in a church wearing a black dress. She sees a bride standing at the altar with her fiancé, getting married. When she draws the veil of the bride, she realizes that the bride is the woman from the photo.

Clarkson, who is now wearing a white wedding dress, runs out of the church and into a dark swamp. A montage of Clarkson singing with her band in a dark swamp is shown alternately with scenes of Clarkson running in the forest and lying on the ground. Clarkson is also seen standing inside an abandoned house, wearing a voluminous black dress. As the rain starts to fall, Clarkson finally collapses, kneeling on the ground while looking at and being comforted by her other self who is singing with the band.

The scene shifts to a present day, where Clarkson is standing at the altar, exchanging vows with her fiancé. Before he puts the ring on her finger, she looks at the guests and notices that the woman from the photo is among the audience. She sees her fiancé exchanging a smile with the woman as the woman blows him a kiss. Clarkson then reaches for the ring and throws it at her fiancé, before running away from the altar. She throws her wedding bouquet into the lap of the woman and shoves her way past the wedding guests who are trying to stop her from leaving. The video ends with Clarkson stepping out the doors into the bright sunlight.

Reception
James Dinh of MTV Newsroom listed "Behind These Hazel Eyes" as one of the music videos with "a bad case of the runaway bride syndrome," writing, "Throughout the clip, Clarkson finds herself running through a swampy mud land until she snaps out of her visions, refuses to proceed with the wedding and makes a shocking escape out of the church." Andrea Holmes of AOL ranked "Behind These Hazel Eyes" at number five in her list of "Top Wedding Music Videos: 15 Clips for the Big 'I Do'." She commented, "The perfect illustration of our point about wedding videos, 'Behind These Hazel Eyes' takes an atypical approach to marriage [...] Throughout the video the weather is dark and rainy, matching the story line, but when Clarkson ditches the wedding and runs out of the church, she is greeted with sunshine. Johnni Macke of E! opined that the video was intense, writing "She is heartbroken and "torn into pieces" throughout the video once she discovers her love is marrying someone else and it results in epic cemetery rock sessions and rolling in the mud." Lyndsey Parker of Yahoo! Music put the song's music video at number 22 on her list of the best matrimony-themed musical videos of all time.

In an interview with MTV, the lead vocalist of Yellowcard, Ryan Key, praised Clarkson in the music video. He said, "She is so unbelievably gorgeous in that video that is all over TV right now [...] The wet wedding dress and the wet hair and ... come on, man! Who knew? She is so hot. She looks so good in it." Robert Copsey of Digital Spy opined that the music video is Clarkson's best video to date. The music video had a successful run at Total Request Live where it topped the chart for 33 days, a record that Clarkson holds for the longest stay by a female artist at number one on the chart.

Live performances

"Behind These Hazel Eyes" was included in the setlist of Clarkson's Breakaway World Tour (2005). During her concert tour at Germain Arena, Clarkson performed the song wearing the same wedding dress she wore in the song's music video. Clarkson also performed "Behind These Hazel Eyes" on her All I Ever Wanted Tour (2009). While touring at Hammerstein Ballroom, New York City, Clarkson sang the stripped down version of the song, accompanied by guitars and vocal. Caryn Ganz of Rolling Stone felt that Alanis Morissette's influence was evident on the chorus of "Behind These Hazel Eyes" which was performed acoustically in the event. Clarkson explained that the arrangement was intended to maximize audience sing-along potential in which Jim Cantiello of MTV thought was effective. In December 2011, Clarkson also performed "Behind These Hazel Eyes" on Chicago Theatre as part of the Miracle on State Street benefit concert. Bob Gendron of the Chicago Tribune reviewed Clarkson's performance, writing "the Texas native could've impressed simply by projecting her booming voice and relishing its prodigious range. Yet she seemed determined to reinforce female empowerment themes often missing from her mainstream-pop contemporaries' hits."

Cover versions
"Behind These Hazel Eyes" was covered by Cassadee Pope in the third season of The Voice. According to Pope, she decided to sing the song in order to reach out to her father who divorced from her mother when she was still 11 years old. Her rendition was praised by Christina Aguilera saying, "I got to feel your heart."

Track listings
 Digital download and CD single
 "Behind These Hazel Eyes" (Album Version) – 3:16
 "Behind These Hazel Eyes" (Live @ Sony Connect) – 3:39
 "Behind Theze Hazel Eyes" (Enhanced CD Video) - 3:16

 Behind These Hazel Eyes – EP
 "Behind These Hazel Eyes" (Joe Bermudez & Josh Harris Mixshow Edit) – 3:29
 "Behind These Hazel Eyes" (Joe Bermudez & Josh Harris Mixshow Remix) – 5:24
 "Behind These Hazel Eyes" (Joe Bermudez & Josh Harris Mixshow Instrumental) – 5:25
 "Behind These Hazel Eyes" (Joe Bermudez & Josh Harris Top 40 Radio Remix) –	3:10
 "Behind These Hazel Eyes" (Joe Bermudez & Josh Harris Acappella) – 2:58

Credits and personnel
Recording
 Recorded by Max Martin, Dr. Luke, Lasse Marten and Kevin M. Guarnieri at Maratone Studios, Stockholm, Sweden and Dr. Luke's NYC & Westlake Audio, Los Angeles, California.

Personnel

 Kelly Clarkson – lead vocals and background vocals
 Shawn Pelton - drums, background vocals
 Dr. Luke – producer, instruments
 Max Martin – producer, instruments
 Johan "Brorsan" Brorsson – pro-tools engineer
 John Hanes – pro-tools engineer
 Serban Ghenea – mixing
 Tim Roberts – mixing assistant

Credits adapted from the liner notes of Breakaway.

Chart positions

Weekly charts

Year-end charts

Certifications

Release history

References

2000s ballads
2004 songs
2005 singles
Kelly Clarkson songs
Music videos directed by Joseph Kahn
Pop ballads
Rock ballads
Song recordings produced by Max Martin
Songs written by Kelly Clarkson
Songs written by Max Martin
Songs written by Dr. Luke
Song recordings produced by Dr. Luke
RCA Records singles
Sony BMG singles
Songs about heartache
Songs containing the I–V-vi-IV progression